Travis Thiessen (born July 11, 1972) is a Canadian retired professional ice hockey defenseman who played over 700 games across North America and Europe. He was selected 67th overall in the 1992 NHL Entry Draft by the Pittsburgh Penguins.

Career statistics

External links 
 

1972 births
Canadian ice hockey defencemen
Cleveland Lumberjacks players
Colorado Gold Kings players
Flint Generals players
Ice hockey people from Saskatchewan
Indianapolis Ice players
Living people
London Knights (UK) players
Manitoba Moose players
Moose Jaw Warriors players
Muskegon Fury players
Sportspeople from North Battleford
Peoria Rivermen (ECHL) players
Peoria Rivermen (IHL) players
Pittsburgh Penguins draft picks
Saint John Flames players
Schwenninger Wild Wings players
Starbulls Rosenheim players
Utah Grizzlies (IHL) players
Canadian expatriate ice hockey players in Germany
Canadian expatriate ice hockey players in the United States